Gorna Oryahovitsa Municipality is a municipality (obshtina) in Veliko Tarnovo Province, central-north Bulgaria. The administrative centre of the municipality is the town of Gorna Oryahovitsa, which is situated at the foot of Arbanashka Mountain, along the Yantra River.

Settlements 

The municipality has 14 settlements (2 towns and 12 villages).

Note: The place names in bold have the status of town (in Bulgarian: град, transliterated as grad). Other localities have the status of village (in Bulgarian: село, transliterated as selo). The names of localities are transliterated in Latin alphabet, followed in parentheses by the original name in Bulgarian Cyrillic (which links to the corresponding Bulgarian Wikipedia article).

Demography 
The following table shows the change of the population during the last four decades.

Religion 
According to the latest Bulgarian census of 2011, the religious composition, among those who answered the optional question on religious identification, was the following:

See also
Provinces of Bulgaria
Municipalities of Bulgaria
List of cities and towns in Bulgaria

References

External links
 Official website 
 Gorna.bg Informational portal for municipality of Gorna Oryahovitsa (Bulgarian)

Municipalities in Veliko Tarnovo Province